A shepherd's hat is a head covering, used by a shepherd to ward off the sun and the elements. Along with a crook, it is an important tool for the shepherd.

Shepherding is ubiquitous across cultures, and is one of the world's oldest occupations, beginning some 5,000 years ago in Asia Minor. It has existed in agricultural communities around the world and an important part of pastoralist animal husbandry. The image of the shepherd has been at the center of pastoral literature and art.

The work keeps the shepherd outdoors, and every culture has developed different headgear to protect the worker.

Background

Given that most shepherds were poor, and lived in an agricultural setting, the shepherd's hat was usually simple and made from readily available materials. For example, wool is one of the oldest known textiles, and hats made from felt may have been known in ancient Sumer.

Historically, the wool knit cap has been a common form of headgear for shepherds, seamen, hunters and others spending their working day outdoors. Hats made from straw, both wide-brimmed and conical were also common. They have been worn throughout the world, with varying styles, all of them are woven using some form of plant fibre. 

A chaperon is a utilitarian garment worn on the head in all parts of Western Europe in the Middle Ages.

The căciulă joasă is a cylindrical fur cap with the top larger than the base. It is worn by shepherds on both sides of the southern Carpathians (in Mărginimea Sibiului, Oltenia, Muntenia and Vrancea) and also in Bărăgan Plain and Dobruja due to this area being used for summer pastures by the Carpathian shepherds, and also in Maramureș.

The pakol is a soft round-topped men's cap, typically of wool from Pakistan, worn by shepherds in northwestern Pakistan southeast Afghanistan.

In popular culture

Cathy Shrank and Raphael Lyne discuss the headwear of farmers and shepherds in Elizabethan England in the poem, A Lover's Complaint.

According to Shrank and Lyne, a "plaited hive of straw" is a woven straw hat, the kind worn by country folk. An example can be seen in Edmund Spenser's The Shepheardes Calender. The scholars also note that "hive" is not a word generally used to describe headgear but may have been used because the hat resembles a beehive, which were conical and made of straw.

The image of the shepherd is a theme found throughout the Bible, and is a symbol that God acts as the Shepherd of His people. This can be represented by the shepherd's hat.

Gallery

See also
 cowboy hat
 Kausia
 Mokorotlo
 Papakha

References

Bibliography

External links
Shepherd's hat at The World of Hat Ethnic Museum

Hats
Farming tools